The ArcFox α-T (Alpha-T) is an all-electric, 5-seater mid-size crossover SUV manufactured by BAIC under the Arcfox brand. The α-T is the first production vehicle under the Arcfox brand. ArcFox is an electric vehicle brand under BJEV, a division of BAIC.

Overview 

The ArcFox α-T was previewed by BAIC BJEV at the Geneva Motor Show 2019 as the ArcFox ECF concept. Prices for the α-T starts from 280,000 yuan ($39,564) in China and the first customer deliveries started in August 2020. The α-T is manufactured by Magna and BJEV in a plant located in Zhenjiang, Jiangsu province. The capacity of the plant previously owned by BAIC is 180,000 vehicles per year.

Specifications 
The motors are powered by a 93.6 kWh battery pack supplied by SK Innovation in South Korea.

The ArcFox α-T comes standard with Level 2 autonomous driving and is equipped with 5G-compatible systems required to eventually meet Level 3 self-driving software updates.

Competitors 

The ArcFox α-T has multiple rivals in the Chinese electric crossover SUV market. It competes against the Roewe Marvel X, Aion LX, XPeng G3, Nio ES6, and Tesla Model Y.

References 

Arcfox vehicles
Cars introduced in 2020
Production electric cars
Crossover sport utility vehicles